Clovis Cros (4 May 1904 – 4 June 1969) was a French racing cyclist. He rode in the 1926 Tour de France.

References

1904 births
1969 deaths
French male cyclists
Place of birth missing